Selina-Maria Edbauer (born 11 March 1998), known professionally as Salena, is an Austrian singer and songwriter. She is set to represent Austria in the Eurovision Song Contest 2023 alongside Teya with the song "Who the Hell Is Edgar?".

Biography 
Selina-Maria Edbauer was born in 1998 in Leoben, Styria.

In 2017, Salena participated in the seventh season of The Voice of Germany, where she reached the dueling rounds. In the show, Samu Haber was her coach. In 2019, she attempted represent Austria at the Eurovision Song Contest with her song "Behind the Waterfall", but ORF did not select her. In 2021, she competed in the Austrian talent show Starmania, where she reached the top 32.

On 31 January 2023, it was announced that Salena had been selected to represent Austria in the Eurovision Song Contest 2023 together with Teya, whom she met during her participation in Starmania. Their entry, named "Who the Hell Is Edgar?", was written at a songwriting camp in the Czech Republic and was released on 8 March 2023.

Discography

Singles

As lead artist
 2019 – "Pretty Imperfection"
 2023 – "Who the Hell Is Edgar?"

As featured artist
 2020 – "Lying Still" (J.K. feat. Salena)
 2021 – "Walking On Clouds " (7YFN feat. Salena)

References 

1998 births
Living people
21st-century Austrian women singers
Austrian pop singers
Austrian singer-songwriters
English-language singers from Austria
Eurovision Song Contest entrants for Austria
Eurovision Song Contest entrants of 2023
People from Leoben
Starmania participants